Finabel is a European organisation for the promotion of cooperation and interoperability between the national armies of the member states of the European Union (EU). Founded in 1953, Finabel is controlled by the chiefs of staff of its member states' armies, and the organisation's work agenda consists of studies and working groups. Finabel also has a relatively small permanent secretariat.

The studies carried out by Finabel take the form of reports resulting from studies and research, entrusted to the working groups, agreements relating to the military characteristics of equipment, as well as conventions on standardising procedures, testing methods and glossaries to facilitate exchanges between member states.

The Finabel coordination committee is a land forces organisation comprising 24 Member states of the European Union with a view to promote interoperability between the land forces of its Member states. Membership is open to all of the Member states of the European Union.

History 
The organisation was founded in October 1953 under the acronym FINBEL by the Army Chiefs of Staff of France, Italy, the Netherlands, Belgium and Luxembourg, and then became FINABEL with the arrival of Germany (Allemagne) in 1956, shortly after West Germany was rearmed in 1955. Later, the name has been kept as a proper noun, written in lower-case, when membership further expanded. Finabel was founded by armies which belonged to both NATO and Western European Union.

Initially, French was the official language of Finabel. In the 2000s the use of English has increased progressively, and since 2011 is the language used across all levels. The Finabel Committee’s initial task focused on cooperation between armament programs. This task quickly developed into the harmonization of army doctrines.

Founding principles 
The tasks of the Finabel Committee have a European perspective; their purpose is to ‘promote and facilitate interoperability between land forces across the full spectrum of military operations through the harmonisation of concepts, doctrines and procedures, whilst taking into account the joint military environment’, and to ‘develop a common European understanding of defence problems by seeking to complement and co-operate with NATO and EU military structures.’
The Finabel Committee takes its decisions based on consensus and equality between its Member states.

The organisation expresses itself through reports entrusted to working groups, which produce ‘studies’ and ‘agreements’ on the military characteristics of equipment or ‘conventions’ that normalise certain procedures and glossaries in order to facilitate discussion between countries.

The proposal and recommendations that result from Finabel’s work can be freely applied by the land components and its member states.

Since the creation of Finabel was not the result of an intergovernmental agreement, Finabel has the status of an informal international de facto association.

Structure

Army Chiefs of Staff/Land Force Commanders Committee 

Executive, the highest level. It meets once a year to summarise work of the past year and to establish the objectives for the coming year. The chairmanship of the committee changes annually.

Principal Military Experts Committee 
The Principal Military Experts (PME) Committee, made up primarily of officers responsible for doctrine, planning and studies within the staff of land components of Finabel member states. It meets twice a year to analyse the directives of the Chiefs of Staff and reformulates them.

Permanent Secretariat 
Located in Brussels, the only permanent structure. It deals with administrative and organisational matters.

Working Groups 
1 Standing Working Group carries out studies (missions) distributed by the Principal Military Experts Committee in various areas of interest to the Armies and preparing the yearly COS meeting.

Actually, all Standing Working Groups are suspended.

Expert Task Groups 
Ad Hoc working group of Subject Matter Experts, mounted on demand of a Finabel Member State.

Member states 

As of 2021, membership consists of 24 countries:

Finabel has as its stated ambition to bring all member states of the European Union within the organisation.

Symbols 
The two crossed swords represent Finabel’s land identity. The twelve stars represent the strong link with Europe, maintained by Finabel since its creation.
The shield represents the defence of peace, a key foundation of European military forces. On the left we can see Ares, Greek God of War, expressing its violence and, on the right we can see the Goddess Athena, who personifies wisdom and the ordered side of war, abiding by the rules which characterise our democracies.

This symbol is summarised by the Latin phrase, which means ‘reflexion serving military action’, Finabel’s essential purpose.

Observers 
Finabel welcomes observer organisations from the EU and NATO: the EDA (European Defence Agency), the EUMS (European Union Military Staff), the NSO (NATO Standardization Office), the NAAG (NATO Army Armament Group), as well as the following bodies: CHENS (CHiefs of European NavieS), EAG European Air Group) and ELDIG (European Land Defence Industry Group; sectorial land component of ASD, the Aerospace and Defence Industries Association of Europe).

The objective is to consult on the different points of views and to prevent any duplication or contradiction of NATO’s doctrine or the concepts outlined by the military organisations of the EU.

Partners 
The European Union Military Staff (EUMS): early warning, strategic planning, and situation assessment
NAAG: The NATO Army Armaments Group is responsible for promoting co-operation and standardisation in the area of land armaments via information exchange and collective activities.
The European Defence Agency (EDA)
The European Air Group (EAG)

References

External links

Bodies of the Common Security and Defence Policy
Organizations established in 1953